Infinity Power Chutes, LLC is an American aircraft manufacturer based in Sturgis, Michigan and headed by Alvie Wall. It was originally located in Bronson, Michigan. The company specializes in the design and manufacture of powered parachutes in the form of ready-to-fly aircraft under the US FAR 103 Ultralight Vehicles rules, the European Fédération Aéronautique Internationale microlight and the American light-sport aircraft categories.

Infinity is a limited liability company.

The company currently offers two models of powered parachute, the Infinity Commander two seat light sport aircraft and the Infinity Challenger single-seater. The US Federal Aviation Administration had 191 aircraft made by Infinity registered in July 2015.

Aircraft

References

External links

Aircraft manufacturers of the United States
Ultralight aircraft
Powered parachutes